The Flight Design Exxtacy is a German high-wing, single or two-place, rigid-wing hang glider that was designed and produced by Flight Design.

Production is complete and the aircraft is no longer available.

Design and development
The Exxtacy was intended as a high-performance rigid-wing hang glider, for competition use and two-place instruction.

The Exxtacy wing is based upon a carbon-fiber-reinforced polymer cantilever box spar, with ribs and wing tips, also of the same material. Control is by weight-shift, with roll control augmented by wing top-surface spoilers. For thermalling flight and landing, inboard flaps were installed. The aircraft achieves a glide ratio of 17.5:1.

The aircraft can be dismantled for ground transport and folds to  x  x .

Variants
Exxtacy 13.5
Single place model. Its  span wing has a nose angle of 165° and the aspect ratio is 9.4:1. In 2003 the aircraft sold for €6078. Certified as DHV Class 3.
Exxtacy Biplace
Two place model. Its  span wing has a nose angle of 165° and the aspect ratio is 10.05:1. In 2003 the aircraft sold for €6509. Certified as DHV Class 3.

Aircraft on display
Deutsches Museum Flugwerft Schleissheim

Specifications (2003 model Exxtacy 13.5)

References

Exxtacy
Hang gliders